Formerly founded as the Sikh Mediawatch and Resource Task Force (SMART) in 1996, the Sikh American Legal Defense and Education Fund (SALDEF) is a national civil rights and educational organization in the United States. SALDEF is a national 501(c) 3 non-profit, nonpartisan, membership-based body.

Mission
SALDEF's mission is to protect the civil rights of Sikh Americans and ensure a fostering environment in the United States for the future generations. SALDEF empowers Sikh Americans through legal assistance, educational outreach, legislative advocacy, and media relations.

History
In 1996, SALDEF began as the Sikh Mediawatch and Resource Task Force (SMART), an all-volunteer organization. During its inception years, SALDEF's primary focus was on media analysis and education. However, based on the needs of the Sikh American community, SMART immediately began responding to civil rights, legislative, employment, and accommodation issues. In November 2004, SMART changed its name to SALDEF. SALDEF currently maintains a professionally staffed national office in Washington, DC. Furthermore, SALDEF has several Regional Directors and local representatives across the country. Additionally, SALDEF's office of legal affairs handles legal matters affecting Sikh and other ethnic or religious minority Americans.

Activities

1. Legal aid
SALDEF's Office of Legal Affairs provides free legal assistance on civil rights and civil liberties issues. The Office of Legal Affairs consists of volunteer attorneys across the U.S., many of whom contribute their pro bono time from their law firms to SALDEF. SALDEF also collaborates with and retains law firms to pursue litigation.

SALDEF's Office of Legal Affairs provides legal assistance for the following issues:
 Workplace racism
 Protecting Sikh articles of faith (such as kirpan and kesh)
 Denial of public accommodation
 Other civil rights and civil liberties issues.

Specifically, the Office of Legal Affairs provides the following assistance:

 Legal assistance line: the SALDEF office is open daily during business hours to field phone calls from Sikh Americans in need of legal advice or assistance on any matter relating the rights affecting an individual or members of the community.
 Legal referrals: SALDEF maintains a network of attorneys around the country who are willing and able to offer legal assistance to Sikh Americans in every geographic area of the country where a large concentration of Sikhs reside.
 Legal representation: SALDEF, in association with national and local law firms, arranges for legal representation of Sikh Americans in instances where litigation is necessary.
 Legislative policy development: SALDEF's attorneys regularly track new developments in the law as they impact the Sikh community, and also conduct research and writing projects to analyze the current state of the law in these areas and identify areas in which challenges lie ahead.
 Legislative advocacy: In coordination with other members and officers of the organization, SALDEF's attorneys work with local, state and federal officials to advocate changes in regulatory and legislative policies in areas which impact the Sikh community.
 Legal research assistance: SALDEF maintains a Legal Database of judicial opinions affecting the Sikh community for the use of lawyers, scholars, reporters, and other interested persons.

2. Government affairs
SALDEF staff and representatives regularly meet with government officials at the local, state, and federal level. These efforts allow for congruous communication on issues affecting the community at the local and federal level.

For example, at the federal level, SALDEF has served on a small working group to address civil rights issues with the Assistant Attorney General for Civil Rights R. Alexander Acosta. As a result, Mr. Acosta visited a Gurdwara in Atlanta to discuss continued collaboration between the federal government and the Sikh American community. Additionally, SALDEF has numerous projects with, and provides consultation to, Federal agencies such as the FBI, CIA, TSA, DOJ, etc.

At the state level, SALDEF has worked with California Assembly Member Judy Chu to organize hearings in Northern and Southern California about hate crimes reporting, law enforcement, and bullying and harassment in public schools. Through local representatives and community members SALDEF delivered testimony at both hearings and provided policy recommendations to constructively deal with these issues.

At the local level, SALDEF has served on the DC Bias Crimes Task Force organized by the U.S. Attorney for the District of Columbia since 2001. Through this effort, SALDEF has worked with the large number of Sikh American cab drivers in the region to report workplace harassment. In addition SALDEF conducts numerous training sessions with State and local law enforcement.

3. Legislative advocacy
SALDEF works on legislative issues influencing the ethnic and religious minority American community on the local and federal level. The issues include support for legislation addressing hate crimes, bullying and harassment in schools, racial profiling, workplace discrimination, civil rights, and immigration.

These important problems are addressed by meeting with elected officials and providing information to policy experts. SALDEF also organizes Sikh Americans to contact their elected members of Congress on specific legislation. As a nonprofit organization, SALDEF is non-partisan and does not support individual candidates through endorsement or finances.

4. Community affairs
SALDEF administers outreach to local Sikh American communities through "Know Your Rights" presentations, community forums, voter registration, and other avenues of civic engagement. It uplifts members of the Sikh American community to become active participants in civil society.

SALDEF's national office supports Regional Directors and Local Representatives to address these issues in communities across the country.

Board of Directors

Deepinder Uppal [Former Executive Director] 
Prior to SALDEF, Deepinder served the dual role of director for the Center for Catholic Studies and Interfaith Dialogue in addition to being a full-time faculty member in the Philosophy and Religious Studies Department at Madonna University. His academic area of research lies in advanced logics and the application of containment, specifically the study of containment strategies - the study of legitimacy of analysis, identification, coercion and containment of unreasonable comprehensive doctrine. His interests are in modern conceptions of justice related to data analysis, constitutional essentials related to the application of containment in domestic policy on the Federal level. Deepinder has presented his research at academic conferences, held workshops at major research institutions and has been the recipient of numerous grants and awards

Mirin Kaur Phool [President] 
Ms. Phool owns and manages a small business in Maryland and is the co-founder of Kaur Foundation, a Sikh American Women's Group, whose mission is to initiate awareness programs that advocate a greater understanding of Sikhs within local communities and political groups. Ms. Phool has served on committees of several civic organizations including the Faith Communities in Action, Immigrant Empowerment Council, Guru Nanak Foundation of America, Parent Teacher Student Association of Montgomery County, and the Rockville Chamber of Commerce. She is married and has two children.

Manjit Singh [Vice Chairperson / Co-founder] 
Mr. Singh co-founded SMART in 1996 and has been active in the Washington D.C. metro area Sikh community since early 1993. He is a computer scientist by profession.

Mr. Singh serves on the Victim Services Advisory Board of the Montgomery County, Maryland. He is a member of the Community Advisory Board for the Washington DC region of the International Channel. Mr. Singh served on the advisory board of the Pew Forum on Religion and Public Life. He also served as Member-at-Large on the Board of the Interfaith Conference of Metropolitan Washington for a tenure of two years . Mr. Singh earned an MS in Computer Science from the State University of New York at Albany and a Bachelor of Engineering in Computer Engineering from University of Bombay, India.

Raman Singh [Secretary] 
Ms. Singh is a small business owner who is active in the Sikh and Interfaith Communities. She serves on the board of trustees for the Sikh Foundation (Michigan) and was involved with the establishment of the Sikh Studies Program at University of Michigan. She works with the World Sabbath for Religious Reconciliation as well as other interfaith organizations, including the television program Interfaith Odyssey, shown in Detroit on PBS. She has a M.S. degree in Mechanical Engineering and is married with two children.

Dr. Inder M. Singh [Member] 
Dr. Inder M. Singh is the CEO and Chairman of LynuxWorks. He founded Excelan, an early leader in local area networks in 1982 and served as its chairman, CEO and president until 1985. Dr. Singh was a co-founder of Kalpana, which spearheaded Ethernet switching technology, and was one of Cisco's early acquisitions. Dr. Singh is a director of PacketStream and PocketPass, and has served on the boards of Mylex, Kalpana, Omnitel, Integrated Media Systems, Univation, Vivix, and Eon Systems. Dr. Singh is board chairman and ELC President for the Embedded Linux Consortium. In addition to his experience with high technology start up companies, Dr. Singh has prior management and technical experience with Zilog, where he headed the Networking and Advanced Systems Development Group. At Zilog, he was the architect of the Z8000 UNIX-based product line. Dr. Singh has also held positions at Amdahl, where he was a Senior Computer Architect, Gartner Research, the Yale Computer Center, and Ontel. He holds Ph.D. and M.Phil. degrees in computer science from Yale University, and an MSEE from Polytechnic Institute of New York. Dr. Singh is very active in the Northern California Bay Area community, and is a co-founder of the Chardhi-Kalaa Sikh Community Center.

Gagandeep Kaur [Member] 
Ms. Kaur is a financial advisor at Prudential Financial in San Diego. She chalks out and manages financial plans for individuals, small businesses, large corporations and non-profit organizations. She also serves on the board of SALDEF. Ms. Kaur is the vice president of the San Diego Alliance for Asian Pacific Islander Americans, a coalition representing 40 San Diego Asian Pacific Islander organizations; a member of the board of trustees of The Sikh Foundation of San Diego; and a co-founder and chairperson of the Greater San Diego Chapter of American Business Women's Association (ABWA), a leading business women's association in the United States.

Dr. Gurpal Singh Bhuller [Member] 
Dr. Bhuller is a practicing orthopedic surgeon in a group practice named Colonial Orthopedics, in Colonial Heights, Virginia. Dr. Bhuller was born in Malaysia and did his orthopedic training in New Zealand. Along with running a medical practice, he is active in several professional organizations, including serving as a Trustee of the John Randolph Foundation, Hopewell, Virginia; Trustee, Cameron Foundation, Petersburg, Virginia; Director, Trinity Laboratories, Maryland; Trustee, Association of Sikh Professionals (ASP); board member, Sikh Education Fund of ASP; Trustee, Sikh Association of Central Virginia; and Director, Sikh Research Institute. Dr. Bhuller is also an avid collector of Sikh artifacts and coins. He is married and has two daughters.

Pavneet Singh Uppal [Esq.] 
Mr. Uppal is an attorney with Bryan Cave LLP with a practice focused on employee benefits litigation and labor and employment disputes, with an emphasis on unfair competition, wrongful discharge and equal employment opportunity litigation. A significant portion of his work involves state and federal court litigation concerning enforcement of covenants not to compete and defending management in lawsuits alleging violations of employment discrimination statutes, contracts and common law rights. In addition, he has experience in designing and implementing alternative dispute resolution mechanisms, as well as counseling employers in the prevention of discrimination and harassment in the workplace. He has litigated employment discrimination cases in federal and state trial and appellate courts, at arbitrations and before administrative agencies, such as the Equal Employment Opportunity Commission, the Arizona Civil Rights Division and the National Labor Relations Board.

See also
''An index of the most important pages on Sikhism, can be found at the Sikh pages.

External links
 Official website
 Activities/Achievements of SALDEF in Focus

Political advocacy groups in the United States
Legal advocacy organizations in the United States
Sikh politics
Sikhism in the United States